John Leipold (February 26, 1888 – March 8, 1970) was an American film score composer.

Selected filmography
 Innocents of Paris (1929)
 Behind the Make-Up (1930)
 Playboy of Paris (1930)
 Monkey Business (1931)
 Horse Feathers (1932)
 It’s a Gift (1934)
 This Reckless Age (1932)
 One Hour With You (1932)
 Make Me a Star (1932)
 Hot Saturday (1932)
 El Príncipe gondolero (1933)
 The Old Fashioned Way (1934)
 Forgotten Faces (1936)
 A Son Comes Home (1936)
 Bulldog Drummond's Revenge (1937)
 Girl Overboard (1937)
 Bulldog Drummond's Peril (1938)
 Bluebeard's Eighth Wife (1938)
 Touchdown, Army (1938)
 Stagecoach (1939)
 The Quarterback (1940)
 Doomed Caravan (1941)
 Shut My Big Mouth (1942)
 Two Yanks in Trinidad (1942)
 Daring Young Man (1942)
 The Desperadoes (1943)
 Doughboys in Ireland (1943)
 Nine Girls (1944)
 Incendiary Blonde (1945)

External links

1888 births
1970 deaths
American film score composers
Best Original Music Score Academy Award winners